Dorothy "Dodo" May Sutton Bundy Cheney (September 1, 1916 – November 23, 2014) was an American tennis player from her youth into her 90s. In 1938, Bundy was the first American to win the women's singles title at the Australian National Championships, defeating Dorothy Stevenson in the final.

Personal life
Cheney was born in Los Angeles, the daughter of Tennis Hall of Famer May Sutton Bundy (1886–1975) and U.S. men's doubles champion Tom Bundy (1881–1945). She was the grandmother of former Major League Baseball player Danny Putnam. Cheney died on November 23, 2014, in Escondido, California at the age of 98.

Tennis career

According to A. Wallis Myers and John Olliff of The Daily Telegraph and the Daily Mail, Bundy Cheney was ranked in the world top 10 in 1937 and 1946 (no rankings issued from 1940 through 1945), reaching a career high of sixth in 1946.

The United States Lawn Tennis Association (USLTA) included Bundy Cheney in its year-end, top-ten rankings of U.S. players from 1936 through 1941, 1943 through 1946, and in 1955. She was ranked third in 1937, 1938, and 1941.

Bundy was a member of the victorious U.S. Wightman Cup teams from 1937 through 1939.

She was inducted into the International Tennis Hall of Fame in 2004.

Cheney was still competing in selected top level events at the age of 51. In 1967, she defeated a seeded player, Karen Krantzcke, in the third round of the Pacific Southwest Championships in straight sets.

Her win–loss singles records against some elite players were as follows:

 21–8   Mary Arnold Prentiss
  9–3   Patricia Canning Todd
  7–2   Doris Hart
  4–1   Billie Jean King
  3–0   Freda James Hammersley
  4–2   Shirley Fry
  6–5   Margaret Osborne duPont
  3–2   Nell Hall Hopman, Thelma Coyne Long
  2–1   Simmone Passemard Mathieu
  1–0   Betty Nuthall, Nelly Adamson Landry
  2–2   Mary Hardwick
  1–2   Katherine Stammers Menzies
  0–1   Althea Gibson, Angela Mortimer, Anita Lizana, Ann Haydon Jones
  0–1   Christine Truman, Lesley Turner Bowrey, Nancy Richey
  2–4   Maureen Connolly
  1–3   Nancye Wynne Bolton
  0–2   Helen Jacobs, Rosemary Casals
  8–11  Sarah Palfrey Cooke
  3–6   Darlene Hard
  0–3   Carole Caldwell, Jadwiga Jedrzejowska
  5–10  Louise Brough
  1–8   Karen Hantze Susman
  1–9   Alice Marble
  1–16  Beverly Baker Fleitz
  8–26  Pauline Betz

By the end of her senior age-groups playing career, Cheney had amassed 394 USTA titles — a record.

Grand Slam and other singles tournaments

In the first singles match of her career at any Grand Slam tournament, Bundy upset second-seeded Sarah Palfrey Fabyan in the first round of the 1936 U.S. National Championships. Bundy ultimately lost in the quarterfinals.

The first nine times that Bundy Cheney played singles at  the U.S. National Championships, she reached at least the quarterfinals. During those (and other) years, she had no "bad" losses at Grand Slam singles tournaments. Her losses were as follows

Bundy Cheney also had several significant singles wins at Grand Slam tournaments:

Cheney won the singles title at the 1944 Tri-Cities Championships in Cincinnati, defeating Betz in the final. The following year, Cheney was the singles runner-up at that tournament.

Grand Slam and other women's doubles tournaments

Bundy Cheney was a three-time runner-up in Grand Slam women's doubles tournaments: 1938 Australian National Championships, 1940 U.S. National Championships, and 1941 U.S. National Championships.

Cheney won the women's doubles title at the 1944 and 1945 Tri-Cities Championships in Cincinnati.

Grand Slam finals

Singles (1 title)

Doubles (3 runner-ups)

Mixed doubles (4 runner-ups)

Other singles finals (54 titles, 60 runner-ups)

Grand Slam singles tournament timeline

R = tournament restricted to French nationals and held under German occupation.

1In 1946 and 1947, the French International Championships were held after the Wimbledon Championships.

See also
 Performance timelines for all female tennis players who reached at least one Grand Slam final

References

External links 
 

1916 births
2014 deaths
American female tennis players
Australian Championships (tennis) champions
Tennis players from Los Angeles
Rollins College alumni
International Tennis Hall of Fame inductees
Grand Slam (tennis) champions in women's singles
21st-century American women